Bernard Odhiambo is a Kenyan former international footballer who played as a midfielder.

Career
Odhiambo played club football for Gor Mahia and Sofapaka.

He earned two international caps for Kenya between 2001 and 2002.

References

Year of birth missing (living people)
Living people
Kenyan footballers
Kenya international footballers
Gor Mahia F.C. players
Sofapaka F.C. players
Kenyan Premier League players
Association football midfielders